Thunder Party is a 2008 album by Cantopop singer Sherman Chung.

Track listing
The release includes the following tracks.
CD
 八十誡 (80 Commandments)
 細細粒 (Tiny Tablets)
 紅磚 (Red Brick)
 野百合 (Wild Lily)
 Best Time 
 Shut Up 
 買得到 (Able To Buy)
 眼睛不說謊 (Eyes Don't Lie)
 一心二用 One Heart Two Use)
 分手的記憶 (Memories Of a Break-up)

DVD
The CD+DVD edition includes a DVD with two music videos:
 野百合 (Wild Lily)
 紅磚 (Red Brick)

References

2008 albums
Sherman Chung albums